The Tucson Monsoon is a football team in the Independent Women's Football League based in Tucson, Arizona. Home games are played on the campuses of Rincon High School & Sahauro High School.

Season-By-Season

|-
| colspan="6" align="center" | Tucson Monsoon (IWFL)
|-
|2006 || 0 || 6 || 0 || X-Team || --
|-
|2007 || 1 || 7 || 0 || 4th West Pacific Southwest || --
|-
|2008 || 2 || 6 || 0 || 4th Tier I West Pacific Southwest || --
|-
|2009 || 5 || 3 || 0 || 14th Tier II || --
|-
|2010* || 1 || 2 || 0 || 2nd Tier II West Pacific West || --
|-
!Totals || 9 || 24 || 0
|colspan="2"| 

* = Current Standing

Season schedules

2009

2010

2013

External links
Tucson Monsoon official website
IWFL official website

Independent Women's Football League
Sports in Tucson, Arizona
American football teams in Arizona
American football teams established in 2006
2006 establishments in Arizona
Women's sports in Arizona